Khalaf Tahuneh (also Romanized as Khalaf Ţāḩūneh, Khalaf Ţāhūneh, and Khalf-e Ţāhūneh; also known as Dālī) is a village in Naqsh-e Rostam Rural District, in the Central District of Marvdasht County, Fars Province, Iran. At the 2006 census, its population was 1,196, in 291 families.

References 

Populated places in Marvdasht County